Ludovico I Gonzaga (1268 – 18 January 1360) was an Italian lord, the founder of the Gonzaga family who was the first capitano del popolo of Mantua and imperial vicar.

Biography
Born in Mantua, he was the son of  Guido Corradi and the grandson of Antonio Corradi.  On 16 August 1328, with the help of Ghibelline troops from Cangrande I della Scala and his father-in-law Guglielmo Azzone Panebarco, he ousted Rinaldo Bonacolsi from Mantua, replacing him as capitano generale. The following 28 August he was elected capitano del popolo ("Captain of the People") by the inhabitants. The following year Louis IV appointed him as imperial vicar and in 1335 he became also lord of Reggio Emilia.

In 1339, he supported Luchino, Giovanni and Azzone Visconti against Mastino II della Scala and Lodrisio Visconti, sending troops that helped the former to win the Battle of Parabiago. In 1342 he helped Pisa stand the Florentine assault.

In 1349 Ludovico housed poet Francesco Petrarca, who visited Vergil's tomb in Mantua. In his late years he fought against Bernabò Visconti. He died at Mantua in 1360 and was buried in the city cathedral.

He was succeeded in Mantua by his son Guido, while his other son Feltrino held Reggio Emilia.

Notes

External links
Genealogy of the Gonzaga of Novellara

1268 births
1360 deaths
Ludovico 1
14th-century condottieri
13th-century Italian nobility
Lords of Mantua
14th-century Italian nobility